Lon David Borgerson (born November 19, 1950) is a Canadian provincial politician. He was the Saskatchewan New Democratic Party member of the Legislative Assembly of Saskatchewan for the constituency of Saskatchewan Rivers from 2003 to 2007. After his defeat in 2007, he stood as the federal New Democratic Party candidate for Prince Albert in the 2015 federal election, and later as the Saskatchewan New Democratic Party candidate for Batoche in the 2020 Saskatchewan election.

Electoral record

|-

 
|NDP
|Lon Borgerson
|align="right"|3,221
|align="right"|41.19
|align="right"|-6.46

|- bgcolor="white"
!align="left" colspan=3|Total
!align="right"|7,819
!align="right"|100.00%
!align="right"|

|-
 
| style="width: 130px" |NDP
|Lon Borgerson
|align="right"|3,446
|align="right"|47.65
|align="right"|+5.07

|- bgcolor="white"
!align="left" colspan=3|Total
!align="right"|7,232
!align="right"|100.00%
!align="right"|

References 

Living people
Saskatchewan New Democratic Party MLAs
Canadian people of Norwegian descent
New Democratic Party candidates for the Canadian House of Commons
Saskatchewan candidates for Member of Parliament
1950 births
21st-century Canadian politicians